Siegfried Alkan (30 March 1858 – 24 December 1941) was a German composer.

Alkan was born in Dillingen, Saarland (then Prussia, now Germany), the son of Johannes Alkan and Johanna Bonn in a family of merchants and musicians. Through his mother he was a distant cousin of the composers Felix Mendelssohn Bartholdy, Fanny Hensel and Giacomo Meyerbeer. It is unknown whether he was related to the French composer and pianist Charles-Valentin Alkan, but like the latter, he was a scion of Jewish families from the Moselle region.

In 1938 the octogenarian Siegfried Alkan became a victim of the "Kristallnacht". His instruments were destroyed and he himself was beaten by Nazi hordes. In his last years he was forced to wear the yellow star.

Many works of Siegfried Alkan seem to be lost. Still known are for example the compositions "Gruß an die Saar" (Op. 32), "O wüsstest du's" (Op. 39), "Neues Saarlied" (Op. 91) and "Ur-Großmütterchen" (Op. 80), which was very popular in the time after World War I.

References

Gregor Brand: Über den saarländischen Komponisten SIEGFRIED ALKAN (in German)

1858 births
1941 deaths
19th-century German Jews
German Romantic composers
People from Saarlouis (district)
German male classical composers
20th-century German male musicians
19th-century German male musicians